St Mary's is a Roman Catholic church in Fleetwood, Lancashire, England. Designed by E. W. Pugin, it was built in 1866–67. It is an active church in the Roman Catholic Diocese of Lancaster. It has been designated a Grade II listed building by English Heritage.

History
The seaside town of Fleetwood was planned in the 1830s by local landowner Peter Hesketh-Fleetwood. St Mary's Church, designed by E. W. Pugin, was built 1866-67 by T. A. Drummond of Fleetwood, costing £4,000. This is equivalent to £ in present-day terms. The foundation stone was laid on 17 May 1866 by Alexander Goss, the Bishop of Liverpool, and the church was consecrated by Bishop Goss in November 1867.  In 1978 the church was designated a Grade II listed building.

Architecture
St Mary's is constructed of rockfaced stone with ashlar dressings and has deeply pitched roofs of slate. Its plan consists of a nave and chancel combined under one roof, low north and south aisles with lean-to roofs, and a polygonal apse. There is no tower. The west wall has two large windows, each with three lancets; between the two is a niche containing a figure of Jesus Christ. The windows in the aisles have large two-light lancets and cinquefoils. The clerestory windows above are quatrefoil oculi.

See also
Listed buildings in Fleetwood

References

Footnotes

Bibliography

Grade II listed churches in Lancashire
Roman Catholic churches in Lancashire
Saint Mary
Fleetwood, St Mary